Costache is a Romanian male given name and surname, derived from Constantin, that may refer to:

Costache Aristia
Costache Caragiale
Costache Conachi
Costache Leancă
Costache Negri

Alexandru Costache
Tamara Costache
Valentin Costache
Victor Costache

Romanian masculine given names
Romanian-language surnames